Heidelberger is a German language habitational surname denoting a person originally living in any one of several settlements named Heidelberg ("heath mountain" or less probably "heathen mountain") and may refer to:
Charles Heidelberger (1920–1983), American cancer researcher 
Irène Heidelberger-Leonard, German literary critic
Jörg Heidelberger (1942–2015), German politician
Mark Heidelberger (born 1977), American film producer
Michael Heidelberger (1888–1991), American immunologist

References 

German-language surnames